The Copa de Honor Cusenier was an international football club competition which was played 13 times between representatives of the Argentina and Uruguay associations between 1905 and 1920.

History
The trophy was donated by "E. Cusenier Fils Auné & Cie.", a French liqueur company that had installed a factory in Buenos Aires in the 1890s, giving its name to the competition. Initially, the cup was set to be played between representatives of AFA, AUF and Liga Rosarina.

The format of the cup consisted in a final between the last champions of Argentine Copa de Honor and Uruguayan Copa de Honor. If necessary, a second match was played. It was similar to Tie Cup but the final games were played at Montevideo instead of Buenos Aires. The first edition was played in 1905 and the last took place in 1920.

List of champions
The following list includes all the editions of the cup. All the final games were held in Montevideo.

Notes

Titles by club

Notes

All-time scorers

See also
 Copa de Honor Municipalidad de Buenos Aires
 Copa de Honor (Uruguay)

References

Defunct international club association football competitions in South America
Argentina–Uruguay football rivalry
c